The Roman Catholic Archdiocese of Díli is an archdiocese located in the city of Díli in Timor-Leste.

The country's only major seminary, the Seminary of SS Peter and Paul, is located within the diocese.

In 1983 Bishop Carlos Filipe Ximenes Belo S.D.B. took over the administration of the Dili diocese. Then the only diocese in the territory, the 700,000 Catholics were divided into 30 parishes administered by 71 priests.

In 2017 the diocese has 28 parishes with 585,958 Catholics. In 2019 it had grown to 30 parishes in the five districts of Dili, Ermera, Aielu, Ainaro and Manufahi. It has 149 priests, including 63 diocesan priests, 86 religious priests, 132 brothers and 432 nuns.

On 11 September 2019, Pope Francis elevated Díli to the status of a metropolitan archdiocese; the Ecclesiastical Province of Díli will have two suffragan sees, the Dioceses of Baucau and Maliana. Bishop da Silva of Díli will be raised to the rank of archbishop.

History
4 September 1940: Established by the bull Sollemnibus Conventionibus of Pope Pius XII as the Roman Catholic Diocese of Díli from the Roman Catholic Diocese of Macau. It was made a suffragan of the Archdiocese of Goa and Daman.
On 1 January 1976 with the bull Ad nominum of Pope Paul VI the diocese was given exempt status, which made it immediately subject to the Holy See.
12 October 1989: Pope John Paul II celebrated Mass with crowds of young people of East Timor.
On 30 November 1996 it lost a portion of its territory to the newly erected Diocese of Baucau.
On 20 June 2002, Portugal's ambassador to East Timor inaugurated the official residence of Dili's archbishop, a €300,000 building financed entirely by the Portuguese government, to replace the archbishop's former home, which had been burned down in September 1999.
In 2009 the East Timorese government gave US$1.5 million to two dioceses in East Timor—Dili and Baucau—which they are to receive annually "to run social programs for people". Poverty remains a massive problem since independence in 2002, with about half of the 1 million population unemployed and 45 per cent living on less than US$1 a day.

Leadership

Bishops
Jaime Garcia Goulart (12 October 1945 – 31 January 1967)
José Joaquim Ribeiro (31 January 1967 – 22 October 1977)
Apostolic administrators
Martinho da Costa Lopes (22 October 1977 – May 1983)
Carlos Filipe Ximenes Belo, S.D.B. (21 March 1988 – 26 November 2002)
named apostolic administrator, a titular bishop
Bishops
Basilio do Nascimento (26 November 2002 – 27 February 2004)
Alberto Ricardo da Silva (27 February 2004 – 9 February 2015)
Virgílio do Carmo da Silva, S.D.B. (30 January 2016 – 11 September 2019)
Archbishops 
 Virgílio do Carmo da Silva, S.D.B. (11 September 2019 – present)

References

External links 
GCatholic.org
Catholic Hierarchy

Christian organizations established in 1940
Dili
Roman Catholic dioceses and prelatures established in the 20th century
Roman Catholic dioceses in East Timor
1940 establishments in the Dutch East Indies